Rumi Nath is an Indian politician and was a member of Assam Legislative Assembly. In 2006, she contested and won election from Borkhola constituency to the Assembly as a BJP candidate. She later defected from BJP and joined Congress. She won the election again in 2011 as a Congress candidate. She is a doctor by profession. She was arrested in April 2015 by Guwahati police for her alleged connection to pan-India auto theft racket. In October 2020, she was expelled from the Indian National Congress for anti-party activities.

Personal life 
In May 2012, she allegedly converted to Islam, changed her name to Rabeya Sultana and married her long time friend. She has a daughter from the marriage.

References

Indian National Congress politicians from Assam
Assam MLAs 2006–2011
Women members of the Assam Legislative Assembly
Living people
Indian prisoners and detainees
Bharatiya Janata Party politicians from Assam
21st-century Indian women politicians
21st-century Indian politicians
Year of birth missing (living people)
Assam MLAs 2011–2016